Herman Preusse (1847–1926) was an important architect in the history of Spokane, Washington. His work includes St. Boniface Church, Convent and Rectory and Mary Queen of Heaven Roman Catholic Church. Architects such as C. Ferris White who worked in his office went on to have prominent careers. Preusse maintained a long and successful business partnership with fellow German architect Julius Zittel

Biography
Preusse was born in Germany in 1847. After his architectural studies he came to the U.S. in 1870 and settled in Spokane Falls in 1882. He designed many of the buildings destroyed by the Great Spokane Fire of 1889 including the Frankfurt, Boston, and Post Office blocks. He went on to design the Blalock and Ziegler buildings, a large Auditorium Theatre with what was once largest stage in the U.S., the Granite Block, the Victoria Hotel, and one of the first buildings at Gonzaga University. His high-profile clients included Edward Herbert Jamieson, Herman A. Van Valkenburg, and Samuel J. Holland.

The Northern Pacific Railroad helped bring commerce to the Northwest. Mining also drew development to the area. Spokane Falls hired Preusse to help plan the development of the area.

Preusse joined with fellow German architect Julius Zittel who started as a draughtsman for Preusse in 1887 before they became business partners in 1893 at Preuss & Zittel. Zittel went on to be Washington's state architect and they collaborated for many years.

Preusse's work includes early Agricultural College and School of Science at Pullman (now Washington State University) buildings,  Gonzaga College buildings including the main administration building and St. Aloysius Church. He did many works for Jesuits but also designed Washington State's first synagogue: Temple Emmanuel.

He also designed the Fernwell building (1890), Carnegie Library (1905), Columbia Building, the state armory (1908), additions to Holy Names Academy (1903), the Huetter House (1897) across the street from Gonzaga, dormitories at WSU, the Peyton Building (1890), the YMCA building (1907, demolished 1964) and Mary Queen of Heaven Roman Catholic Church in Sprague, Washington.

He died in Spokane on December 10, 1926.

Selected works
Bump Block-Bellevue House-Hawthorne Hotel, S 206 Post St., Spokane, WA, (Preusse & Zittel), NRHP-listed
Holy Names Academy Building, 1216 N. Superior St., Spokane, WA, (Preusse & Zittel), NRHP-listed
Mary Queen of Heaven Roman Catholic Church, N. First and B St., Sprague, WA, (Preusse, Herman), NRHP-listed
Peyton Building and Peyton Annex, 722 W. Sprague Ave./10 N. Post St., Spokane, WA, (Preusse, Herman), NRHP-listed
Ritzville Carnegie Library, 302 W. Main St., Ritzville, WA, (Preusse & Zittel), NRHP-listed
Spokane Public Library, 10 S. Cedar, Spokane, WA, (Preusse & Zittel), NRHP-listed
St. Boniface Church, Convent and Rectory, 206 St. Boniface St., Uniontown, WA, (Preusse, Herman), NRHP-listed

References

 

1847 births
1926 deaths
19th-century American architects
Architects from Washington (state)
20th-century American architects